Sunset Lawn may refer to:

Larkin Sunset Lawn Cemetery, a cemetery in Salt Lake County, Utah
Sunset Lawn Chapel of the Chimes, Sacramento, California
Sunset Lawn Cemetery (Harrisburg, Illinois), Harrisburg, Illinois